Kamo Wildlife Sanctuary is a privately owned zoo located near Kamo, Whangarei, New Zealand. The facility houses a collection of three species of large cats and was formerly used as a location for the filming of the television series The Lion Man.

History

Zion Wildlife Gardens
Craig Busch established Zion Wildlife Gardens in 2002 from bare land situated on Gray Road, Kamo, Whangarei. Busch had previously had the zoo based at Kerikeri.

During 2006 Zion Wildlife Gardens became financially troubled. Busch accepted a bail out package from his mother Patricia Busch, and in accordance with an agreement dated 13 July 2006, he resigned as director and appointed Mrs Busch,  as sole director.

Busch continued working at Zion until his dismissal on 3 November 2008.

During November 2008, media reports revealed an investigation into the welfare of the cats at the zoo had been conducted by Ministry of Agriculture and Forestry. Concerns included animals being kept in unsanitary conditions, damaged enclosures and the surgical declawing of 21 lions and 9 tigers.

In February 2009, the Ministry of Primary Industries (formerly MAF) released the results of its investigation into the surgical declawing of 21 lions and 9 tigers at the facility between the years 2000 to May 2008. The contents of the report revealed vets had been initially approached by Mr Busch to have the procedures done. Busch had requested the procedures were to be kept in confidence. The findings in the report found any question of prosecutions under the Animal Welfare Act 1999 were problematic due to Ministry of Primary Industries veterinarians being aware, but not questioning the procedures at the time.

On 27 May 2009 a zookeeper, South African National Dalu Mncube, was mauled to death by a white tiger while cleaning an enclosure. The tiger was shot dead in order to reach Mncube.  The same tiger, a  male named Abu, had bitten another handler earlier the same year, who was rescued by Mncube. The park closed and re-opened after less than one month, following changes to the big cat enclosures to improve safety for handlers and the public.

During June 2013 Zion Wildlife Gardens operator Patricia Busch lost her assets. The finance company that held the security over the property took possession, after Mrs Busch was unable to continue the mortgage payments.

In December 2013, the Coroner's report  on the inquest into the death of senior cat handler Dalu Mncube cleared the management and staff of any wrongdoing in relation to the incident. Shortland recommended regulatory reform and new legislation for health and safety in zoos and animal parks.

Receivership
David Bridgman and Colin McCloy of Price Waterhouse Coopers Limited  were appointed receivers of the company that operated Zion Wildlife Gardens, Zion Wildlife Gardens Limited (In Receivership & In Liquidation), on 26 July 2011. Subsequent to this, the official assignee was appointed liquidator of the company on 22 August 2011, after the Inland Revenue made a successful application to the High Court to have Zion Wildlife Gardens Ltd placed into liquidation.

On 31 January 2012 the receivers announced the sale of Zion Wildlife Gardens Ltd. to Zion Wildlife Kingdom Ltd. The receivers had been on site that morning to advise those at the park of the sale. Details of the sale were considered to be commercially sensitive and as a result, the receivers did not comment further on the sale and purchase agreement or the new owners.

Kingdom of Zion

On 31 January 2012, the park with land and assets, was sold to Zion Wildlife Kingdom Ltd, owned by Tauranga-based accountant Ian Stevenson and Cambridge based businesswoman Tracey McVerry and Nicholas Mes.  On 5 April 2012 the facility was reopened as Kingdom of Zion. The day-to-day management of the facility was through Earth Crest Limited which had as its sole shareholder Suzanne Eisenhut.

On May 10, 2012, Zion Wildlife Kingdom co-director and shareholder, Tauranga based chartered accountant Ian Stevenson, was censured by the New Zealand Institute of Chartered Accountants, and was ordered to pay the $42,889 cost of his prosecution. Stevenson pleaded guilty to three charges arising from a client complaint; dealing with client monies through his practice account rather than a trust account, withdrawing fees without authority and preparing accounts without due care and diligence.

In April 2013, Tauranga based business consultant Sam Bailey failed when he applied the High Court in Tauranga to have the park's operating company Earth Crest Limited, placed into liquidation. . Associate High Court Judge Jeremy Doogue reserved his decision into the application made by Bailey to liquidate Earth Crest Ltd (trading as Kingdom of Zion Ltd) after the hearing in May 2013.

In October 2013, the Employment Relations Authority gave former worker Neville Bradford leave to pursue an unjustified dismissal claim against Kingdom of Zion's operating company Earth Crest Limited. Bradford had been dismissed in July 2012, after working at Kingdom of Zion as a groundsman since the end of January 2012.

In November 2013, Zion Wildlife Kingdom Ltd co-director and shareholder Ian Stevenson, was struck off by the New Zealand Institute of Chartered Accountants. Stevenson was charged with conduct unbecoming of an accountant and negligence and/or incompetence in a professional capacity. He was also charged with breaching the NZICA's rule 21.4(b) and breaching the institute's code of ethics.

On January 31, 2014 the shareholding and directorship of Zion Wildlife Kingdom Ltd, was transferred to Bolton Equities Ltd an Auckland-based investment company.

During May 2014, the Employment Relations Authority ruled Earth Crest Ltd, the company operating the business Kingdom of Zion, was required to pay former employee Neville Bradford the sum of $11,000. The amount related to unpaid wages owed to Bradford by his employer. The Authority also found Bradford had not been unjustifiably dismissed by Earth Crest Limited.

In July 2014, the Ministry of Primary Industries ordered the zoo to close to the public until the enclosures were upgraded to meet containment requirements.

During early August, the business operated by Earth Crest Limited was purchased by Bolton Equities. The company planned to upgrade the zoo facility for a future major tourist attraction with the name changed to Kamo Wildlife Sanctuary.

Kamo Wildlife Sanctuary 
Kamo Wildlife Sanctuary was established in 2014 by Bolton Equities after the Ministry of Primary Industries closed its predecessor Kingdom of Zion citing compliance issues. In 2015 it was reported the zoo was still closed as Kamo Wildlife Sanctuary management worked its way through a list of remedial work required.  In January 2021, the reopening of the park was said to be approaching. In May 2021, the park was closed to the public. During October 2021 it was reported in the Northern Advocate the animals at the facility were at risk of being euthanised after it was alleged MPI had continued to delay the granting of a licence for the zoo to open. The landowner Bolton Equities had spent more than NZ$9 million upgrading the enclosures and facilities at the site. In December 2021, MPI granted Kamo Wildlife Sanctuary the necessary licences to operate; it opened to the public during the same month. 

Big Cats Ltd, the operating arm of the business, was placed into involuntary liquidation on 1 March 2023. Its operator Jan Vallance stated at the time negotiations were underway with the liquidator, the Official Assignee, and other stakeholders.

Resident Animals 

Abdullah - lion
Amafu - (white-coated) lion
Cleo - lion
Cora - lion
Imvula - (white-coated) lion
Indira - tiger
Laduma - (white-coated) lion
Mandla - (black-coated) leopard
Sabie - (white-coated) lion
Savannah - lion
Shanti - (white-coated) tiger
Shikira - lion
Shumba - lion
Sibili - (white-coated) lion
Themba - (white-coated) lion
Timba - (white-coated) lion

Abu - (white-coated) tiger (deceased)
Anila - (white-coated) tiger (deceased)
Aotea - (white-coated) tiger (sent to Africa)
Aslan - lion (deceased)
Azra - (white-coated) tiger (on loan to Pouakai Zoo)
Foxy - chacma baboon (deceased)
Gandor - (white-coated) lion (deceased)
Jabu - lion (deceased)
Jahdu -(white-coated) tiger (deceased)
Kahli -tiger (deceased)
Kala - (white-coated) tiger (on loan to Pouakai Zoo)
Kenya - cheetah (deceased)
Khan - (white-coated) tiger (deceased)
Kiwi - (white-coated) tiger (sent to Africa)
Marah - (white-coated) lion (deceased)
Moya - (white-coated) lion (deceased)
Narnia - lion (deceased)
Rewa -(white-coated) tiger (deceased)
Rongo - (white-coated) tiger (sent to Africa)
Samson - lion (deceased)
Shania - lion (deceased)
Shikana -tiger (deceased) 
Silas - serval (deceased)
Sita -tiger (deceased)
Tane - (white-coated) tiger (sent to Africa)
Tanza - lion (deceased)
Thabo - cheetah (deceased)
Tshaka - lion (deceased)
Tygo -(white-coated) tiger (deceased)
Zamba - lion (deceased)
Zion - lion (deceased) (external link:Kamo big cat park euthanises Zion the lion)
Zoe - serval (deceased)

References

External links

Buildings and structures in Whangārei
Zoos in New Zealand
Tourist attractions in the Northland Region
Zoos established in 2002
2002 establishments in New Zealand